The 2022 Brown Bears football team represented Brown University as a member of the Ivy League during the 2022 NCAA Division I FCS football season. The team was led by third-year head coach James Perry and played its home games at Richard Gouse Field at Brown Stadium.

Previous season

The Bears finished the 2021 season with a record of 2–8, 1–6 Ivy League play to finish in a 3 way tie for last place.

Schedule

Game summaries

Bryant

Harvard

at Rhode Island

at Central Connecticut

at Princeton

Cornell

Penn

at Yale

Columbia

at Dartmouth

References

Brown
Brown Bears football seasons
Brown Bears football